David Gamble (born June 14, 1971) is a former wide receiver for the Denver Broncos. He was signed by the Broncos in 1997, and went on to win Super Bowl XXXII over the Green Bay Packers, however he was released in 1998 to clear roster space.

Football career
In May 1994, the Philadelphia Eagles signed David as a free agent. He was released during preseason and then signed with the San Antonio Texans of the Canadian Football League. He played there for two seasons before getting an opportunity to play in the NFL. From April 1996 to July 1998, he played for the Denver Broncos of the National Football League. During his tenure, he played backup receiver and was a significant contributor on special teams. David was a member of the 1998 Super Bowl Championship Team. David's professional football career ended in November 1998 after one season as wide receiver and special teams player for the Winnipeg Blue Bombers of the Canadian Football League.

He was assistant coach for the Siena College football program from 1999-2002.

References

American football wide receivers
Denver Broncos players
Living people
San Antonio Texans players
1971 births
Winnipeg Blue Bombers players
Sportspeople from Albany, New York
Siena Saints football coaches
Philadelphia Eagles players